Marius Bianchi (1823–1904) was a French politician. He served as a member of the Chamber of Deputies from 1876 to 1881, representing Orne.

References

1823 births
1904 deaths
People from Saint-Tropez
Politicians from Provence-Alpes-Côte d'Azur
Appel au peuple
Members of the 1st Chamber of Deputies of the French Third Republic
Members of the 2nd Chamber of Deputies of the French Third Republic